Solaikuyil is a 1989 Indian Tamil language action thriller film, directed by  Rajan, starring Karthik, Ragini Karthik and Radha Ravi. The film was released on 3 June 1989.

Plot 

Maruthu enters the town of Mulimalai introducing himself as the grandson of the respected Mookaiya Devar, who left for Singapore years ago. While the others accept his claim, the village guardsman, Maayandi, is suspicious. Maruthu is drawn to the withdrawn Ponnuthaye. Her brother Kaali was convicted of raping and killing Valli, her friend. Kaali was sentenced to death but has escaped and is on the run. Ponnuthayee has no one other family expect Maayandi, who was Kaali's friend and sees her as a sister.

Maruthu and Ponnuthaayee fall in love and a suspicious Maayandi makes his disapproval clear. Maruthu investigates and learns that Valli's intended accidentally killed her when he attempted to rape her and placed the blame on Kaali. Now exonerated, Kaali is still missing. The villagers are grateful for Maruthu's help and arrange for his wedding to Ponnuthayee. Maayandi, while also grateful for Maruthu's help, is still suspicious of him and makes it clear he does not believe Kaali will ever return. When it is confirmed that Kaali has been murdered the town is, once again, thrown into confusion and must resolve the mystery of his murder as well as Maruthu's true origins.

Cast 
Karthik as Maruthu
Ragini Karthik as Ponnuthaayee
Radha Ravi as Maayandi (Thalaiadi)
Pandian as Kaali
S. S. Chandran
Ganthimathi as Angamma
Kovai Sarala as Punitha
Kuyili as Valli
Raghavi
Thiyagu as Valli's intended
Ponvannan

Soundtrack 
The soundtrack was composed by M. S. Murari.

Yerikkarai Orathile – Gangai Amaran, S. P. Sailaja
Kannula Nikkudhu Nenjula – S. P. Balasubrahmanyam, Lalitha
Karugamani Iru Saradu – K. S. Chithra, Prabakar
Kottunga Ketti Melam – S. P. Balasubrahmanyam
Chinnansirusugal Kannam – Uma Ramanan, Prabakar
Poongatre Kelayo – K. S. Chithra
Malainattu Machane – K. S. Chithra
Vasantha Poongatre Konjam – S. P. Balasubrahmanyam

Reception 
Kalki wrote .

References

External links 
 

1989 films
1980s Tamil-language films
1989 action thriller films
Indian action thriller films